Martin Kližan and Philipp Oswald were the defending champions, but they chose not to participate this year.
Mate Pavić and Michael Venus won the title, defeating Jean-Julien Rojer and Horia Tecău in the final, 7–6(7–4), 2–6, [10–8].

Seeds

Draw

Draw

References
 Main Draw

Doubles